The Moon Goddess and the Son is a science fiction novel by American writer Donald Kingsbury, published by Baen in 1986. The novel was an expanded version of a novella published in the December 1979 issue of Analog magazine, which was a nominee for the Hugo Award for Best Novella in 1980.

Along with the novella, Kingsbury and Roger Arnold published a nonfiction article describing the technologies used in the story for achieving cheap access to Low Earth orbit and beyond.

References

External links 

1986 novels
1986 science fiction novels
Works originally published in Analog Science Fiction and Fact
Baen Books books
Books with cover art by David Burroughs Mattingly